First Scandinavian Baptist Church is a historic church near Trent, South Dakota. It was built in 1888 and was added to the National Register in 2000.

It was deemed notable as it "typifies the 'first generation' of church construction in eastern South Dakota."

References

Baptist churches in South Dakota
Churches on the National Register of Historic Places in South Dakota
Churches completed in 1888
Churches in Moody County, South Dakota
National Register of Historic Places in Moody County, South Dakota